Elizabeth Larner (29 October 1932 – March 11, 2022) was a British actress and singer with a powerful soprano voice. While her main career was the musical theatre, appearing both in London's West End and on Broadway, she also played Ammonia in the BBC situation comedy Up Pompeii!. She later appeared in The Two Ronnies, supporting Ronnie Barker as "Piggy Malone" and Ronnie Corbett as "Charley Farley" in the 1981–1982 comic detective mystery serial Band of Slaves.

Larner appeared on television from the mid-1950s. Her singing gained notice in the original London Coliseum production of Kiss Me, Kate when the star of the show Patricia Morison was ill. Larner was her understudy; she had previously been a member of the chorus. She then toured as Kate/Lilli in Kiss Me, Kate with Christopher Hewett as Fred/Petruchio, and played leading roles in West End productions of Wish You Were Here, Kismet, and Camelot with Laurence Harvey as Arthur. She recruited millions more admirers with her numerous television appearances. She recorded an album of "vocal gems" from The New Moon and Rose-Marie with Andy Cole in one of HMV's (EMI) first stereo recordings. {To hear her voice from this recording, it is now partly available - The New Moon tracks at least - as a "filler" in the recent re-release of the June Bronhill/Edmund Hockridge version of The Desert Song - EMI CFP 3359872}.  She continued to contribute to the various HMV/EMI studio recordings of musicals up until the late 60s. Her film work in the 1970s includes appearances in Song of Norway (1970) and Royal Flash (1975).

During the 1980s, she was living in the New York City area and appeared in two Broadway productions: as Mrs. Bumble/Mrs. Bedwin in the 1984 Cameron Mackintosh revival of Oliver! with Ron Moody and Patti LuPone, and as Lady Diss/Mrs. Brown in the 1986 first American production of Me and My Girl with Robert Lindsay, Maryann Plunkett and Jane Connell. She also appeared in an Off-Off-Broadway cabaret revue, Don't Cry, Baby, It's Only a Movie, with lyrics by Fran Landesman and music by Jason McAuliffe. By the 1990s, she had retired to Venice, Florida. Larner died there on March 11, 2022, at the age of 89.

References

External links

1932 births
2022 deaths
British actresses
British women singers